Raped by an Angel 2: The Uniform Fan (強姦2制服誘惑) is a 1998 Category IIB Hong Kong film directed by Aman Chang, with a scenario by Wong Jing. It is the second installment of the Raped by an Angel film series.

Cast
 Athena Chu as Po Wan Yu
 Francis Ng as “Bully” Tong Kee Kong
 Jane Chung Chun as “Jenny” Chung Bo Yu
 Yeung Faan
 Joe Ma as the Uniform Fan
 Chang Yin
 Ronald Wong Pan
 Ha Ping
 Rocky Lai Keung Kun
 Kong Foo Keung
 Chan Po Chun
 Aman Chang
 Mei Yee
 Ng Ka Wai

References

External links
 

1998 films
Hong Kong crime thriller films
1990s Cantonese-language films
Sexploitation films
1998 crime thriller films
Rape and revenge films
Films directed by Aman Chang
1990s Hong Kong films